The white-bellied skink (Oligosoma hoparatea) is a species of skink endemic to the South Island of New Zealand. It is critically endangered, with an estimated 250 individuals in the wild.

References

Oligosoma
Reptiles of New Zealand
Reptiles described in 2018
Taxa named by Anthony Whitaker
Taxa named by David G. Chapple
Taxa named by Rod A. Hitchmough
Taxa named by Marieke Lettink
Taxa named by Geoff B. Patterson